Leonard Blanchard Chandler  (August 29, 1851 – November 9, 1927) was a Massachusetts businessman and politician who served in the 1917 Massachusetts Constitutional Convention, in both branches of the Massachusetts legislature, both branches of the city council and as the twelfth Mayor of Somerville, Massachusetts.

Early life 
Chandler as born August 29, 1851 to Leonard and Sarah (Blanchard) Chandler in Princeton, Massachusetts.

Family life 
Chandler married Hattie Betsey Stewart of Charlestown, Massachusetts in Princeton, Massachusetts, on October 22, 1874.  They had three children.

1917 Massachusetts Constitutional Convention
In 1916 the Massachusetts legislature and electorate approved a calling of a Constitutional Convention. In  May 1917, Chandler was elected to serve as a member of the Massachusetts Constitutional Convention of 1917, representing the 23rd Middlesex District of the Massachusetts House of Representatives.

References

1851 births
Members of the Massachusetts House of Representatives
Massachusetts state senators
People from Princeton, Massachusetts
Members of the 1917 Massachusetts Constitutional Convention
Mayors of Somerville, Massachusetts
1927 deaths